Floirac is the name of several communes in France:

 Floirac, former commune of the Aveyron department, now part of Onet-le-Château
 Floirac, Charente-Maritime
 Floirac, Gironde
 Floirac, Lot